Opisthacanthus africanus is a species of African scorpion.

Distribution
This species can be found in the sub-Saharan Africa (Angola, Cameroon, Republic of Congo, Gabon, Guinea, Mozambique).

Habitat
This species has an arboreal habit. It can be found in holes in tree trunks and in the spaces behind peeling barks.

References

 Simon, 1876 : Études sur les Arachnides du Congo (2° article). Bulletin de la Société zoologique de France, vol. 1, p. 216-224.

Scorpions described in 1876
Arthropods of Africa
Hormuridae